Palash Muchhal (born 22 May 1995) is an Indian music composer and film score composer from Indore, Madhya Pradesh, India. He and his elder sister Palak Muchhal perform stage shows across India and abroad to raise funds for poor children who need financial assistance for the medical treatment of heart disease. As of May 2013 they have raised funds of INR 25 million (US$390,000) through her charity shows which has helped to save lives of 885 children suffering from heart ailments.

Background

Palash Muchhal was born on 22 May 1995 into a Marwari family in Indore. His mother, Amita Muchhal, is a homemaker and his father, Rajkumar Muchhal, serves in a private firm. He's doing B.Com. 2nd year from Indore. He also performs stage shows with his elder sister Palak across India and abroad to raise funds for poor children who need financial assistance for the medical treatment of heart disease. As of May 2013, they've raised funds of 25 million (US$390,000) through charity shows which have helped to save lives of 885 children suffering from heart ailments.

2014–present
His debut movie – Dishkiyaoon was released on 28 March 2014. He has also given music in Bhoothnath Returns, Dishkiyaoon, Amit Sahni Ki List. His famous songs are "Party Toh Banti Hai" from Bhoothnath Returns, "Tu hi hai Aashiqui" from Dishkiyaoon and "What The Fark" from Amit Sahni Ki List. and "Musafir".

He has also acted in Khelein Hum Jee Jaan Sey as Jhunkoo which film is directed by Ashutosh Gowariker and starring Abhishek Bachchan and Deepika Padukone.

In 2017 he composed a music video "Tu Jo Kahe" starring Parth Samthaan and Anmol malik.
In 2018 he composed a music video "Nishaa" starring Parth Samthaan and Charlie Chauhan.
In 2018 he composed another music video "Fans nahi Friends" starring Parth Samthaan Niti Taylor and Varun Sharma which they solely dedicated to their fans.

Achievements

Muchhal is the youngest music composer/director in Bollywood(India) at 18. He has recently entered his name in golden book of world records as the youngest music composer of Bollywood.

Television

He has also performed in TV shows like Entertainment Ke Liye Kuch Bhi Karega and Shabhaash India where Muchhal played keyboard with his head, chin and knee.

Bollywood discography

As singer

As director

Upcoming projects

He's currently working on 19 films including, directing his first film "BroJaan" which holds a record of being the first film to be shoot on i-phone 6s. (Jungle Cry) releasing in 2019 as a music director

References

Teenage Composer Palash Muchhal Hits The Right Notes, The Times of India. Retrieved 15 April 2014 .

External links 
 Twitter Profile

Living people
1995 births